Bennington Township is one of the sixteen townships of Morrow County, Ohio, United States.  The 2010 census found 3,102 people in the township, 342 of whom lived in the village of Marengo.

Geography
Located in the southern part of the county, it borders the following townships:
Harmony Township - north
Chester Township - northeast corner
South Bloomfield Township - east
Hilliar Township, Knox County - southeast corner
Porter Township, Delaware County - south
Kingston Township, Delaware County - southwest corner
Peru Township - west
Lincoln Township - northwest

The village of Marengo is located in northwestern Bennington Township.

Name and history
Bennington Township was organized in 1817, and named after Bennington, Vermont, the native home of a first settler. Statewide, the only other Bennington Township is located in Licking County.

Government
The township is governed by a three-member board of trustees, who are elected in November of odd-numbered years to a four-year term beginning on the following January 1. Two are elected in the year after the presidential election and one is elected in the year before it. There is also an elected township fiscal officer, who serves a four-year term beginning on April 1 of the year after the election, which is held in November of the year before the presidential election. Vacancies in the fiscal officership or on the board of trustees are filled by the remaining trustees.

References

External links
County website

Townships in Morrow County, Ohio
1817 establishments in Ohio
Populated places established in 1817
Townships in Ohio